Antoninów  is a village in the administrative district of Gmina Piaseczno, within Piaseczno County, Masovian Voivodeship, in east-central Poland. It is ethnically Polish, though some foreigners are present in the community.

References

Villages in Piaseczno County